Dancing on Tables Barefoot is the debut solo album by Irish singer Tara Blaise released in 2005.

Background
Blaise had previously met John Hughes, the manager of The Corrs, when he was looking for a vocalist to sing on his own album. Hughes signed him to his label, Spokes, and the Corrs' producer, Olle Romo, produced her solo debut. The first single from the album, "Fool for Love," was touted by BBC Radio 2 broadcasters Terry Wogan and Jonathan Ross.

The album was re-issued in 2006 on DRO/Atlantic with four additional songs.

Critical reception
The album received mixed reviews. The Sunday Times praised it: "Pretty much everything here could be a single - and there aren't many albums you can say that about." RTÉ gave the album 3/5 stars, praising Blaise's voice but calling some of the songs "inane." Several reviewers compared Blaise's music to Kate Bush and Joni Mitchell, as well as the Corrs.

Track listing 

All songs written by John Hughes and Tara Blaise
 "The Three Degrees" – 3:53
 "Superman in a Bottle" – 3:39
 "Fool for Love" – 3:32
 "21 Years" – 3:38
 "Paperback Cliché" – 3:26
 "Later" – 3:26
 "For Your Own Good" – 3:44
 "Feel Free" – 3:58
 "Radio Star" – 3:14
 "Ladybird" – 4:17
 "Little Girl" – 3:10
 "Unbearable Lightness" – 	5:13

Re-release 

 "21 Years"
 "Didn't Make the Cover"
 "The Three Degrees" (Remix)
 "Paperback Cliché"
 "Fool for Love"
 "Fall for You"
 "Superman in a Bottle"
 "Feel Free"
 "Ladybird"
 "Later"
 "For Your Own Good"
 "Primrose"
 "Unbearable Lightness"
 "Winter Wonderland" (Bernard Felix, Richard B Smith)

Personnel 

Tara Blaise – Vocals, Background Vocals
Brian Byrne – String Arrangements
Anthony Drennan – Guitar
Jason Duffy – Drums
Simon Fowler – Sleeve Photo
John Hughes – Producer
Irish Film Orchestra – Additional Strings
Steve MacMillan – Mixing
Roger Joseph Manning Jr. – Keyboards
Stephen Marcussen – Mastering
Tony Molloy – Bass
Andrew Murray – Production Coordination
Rob O'Connor – Photography
Tim Pierce – Guitar
Olle Romo – Drums, Programming, Producer, Engineer
Max Surla – String Orchestrations
Caitriona Walsh – Orchestra Manager
Lyle Workman – Guitar

References 

2005 debut albums
Tara Blaise albums
Albums produced by Olle Romo
Atlantic Records albums